Sir Egbert Udo Udoma,  KBE, (21 June 1917 – 2 February 1998) was a lawyer and justice of the Nigerian Supreme Court. He was Chief Justice of Uganda from 1963 to 1969. He spent 13 years as a judge on the Supreme Court of Nigeria and was chairman of the Constituent Assembly from 1977 to 1978. He was one of the founding fathers of Nigeria. Udoma was one of the first black Africans to earn a PhD in Law in 1944 from Oxford University. He was knighted by Queen Elizabeth of England and was a devoted Methodist and a holder of Knight of John Wesley (KJW).

Life

He was born in the Ibibio area of Akwa Ibom State and attended Methodist College, Uzuakoli. After completing his secondary education, he proceeded abroad to study at Trinity College, Dublin (TCD) with the support of his community and the Ibibio Union, an organization which he later led. At TCD, he served as president of the University Philosophical Society, the student debating society. He later earned a postgraduate degree at Oxford University.

His mother, Madam Adiaha Edem Udo Udoma, a women’s leader and over 400 women in Opobo Division were killed by colonial troops and police in their struggle to stop women’s taxation in 1929.

He returned to Nigeria to practise law in the mid-1940s, but became intrigued and moved by the nationalistic politics of the time. At the time, Nigeria was attracting returning emigrants who had left previously. He joined the National Council of Nigeria and the Cameroons early on, but left the party following a crisis in the former Eastern Region that saw the removal of Eyo Ita, an Ibeno man from office as the leader of the Eastern Region by Azikiwe. From 1953 to 1959, Udo Udoma was a member of the federal House of Representatives, under the platform of the United National Independence Party, then he was a leading proponent for the creation of a Calabar/Ogoja/Rivers state. However, his failure to succeed in the creation of an independent region or state in south-eastern Nigeria, and the triumph of the three major regions at a constitutional conference in 1958, led him to concede politics to the dominant parties.

He spent four years as a High Court judge before he was appointed Chief Justice in Uganda. He was a knight of the British Empire and also belonged to the group that championed Nigerian independence from Britain and was one of the founding fathers of Nigeria. He died at the age of 80 on 2 February 1998.

Personal life

He was the subject of two biographies: The Man: Sir Justice Udo Udoma by Dennis Udo-Inyang, and Law and Statesmanship: The Legacy of Sir Udo Udoma by Ekong Sampson. 
In 2008 the Estate of Sir Udo Udoma released The Eagle In Its Flight: Being The Memoir of the Hon. Sir Udo Udoma, CFR (Grace & Son).
His third son Udoma Udo Udoma was a distinguished Senator of the fourth republic of the Federal Republic of Nigeria and is the incumbent Minister of Budget and Planning under the Buhari administration.

Publications

 The Lion and the Oil Palm and Another Essay (1943)
 The Story of the Ibibio Union (1987)
 History and the Law of the Constitution of Nigeria (1994)

References

Nigerian Knights Commander of the Order of the British Empire
Nigerian recipients of British titles
Nigerian judges
1917 births
1998 deaths
Nigerian judges on the courts of Uganda
Nigerian legal scholars
20th-century Nigerian lawyers
Alumni of the University of Oxford
Ibibio people
Alumni of Trinity College Dublin
Chief justices of Uganda